The sof passuk (Hebrew: , end of verse, also spelled sof pasuq and other variant English spellings, and sometimes called סילוק silluq) is the cantillation mark that occurs on the last word of every verse, or passuk, in the Tanakh. Some short verses contain only members of the sof passuk group.

The sof passuk can be preceded by the marks mercha, tipcha, and mercha in that order, including either all or some of these. However, these merchot and tipchot do not necessarily have the same melody as those in the etnachta group. Altogether, there are five possible arrangements how these can appear.

Total occurrences

Melody
Different melodies are assigned to the trope for each section of the Hebrew Bible: The Torah, the Haftarah, and the Megillot. Different Jewish communities also use different Torah tropes. The following should not be considered an exhaustive list of all possible cantillations.

Basic
Appears at the end of a verse.

Sof parasha/sof hachelek
Appears at the end of a parashah.

In the Ten Commandments
There is controversy over the use of the sof passuk during the reading of the Ten Commandments. There are two versions of the trope sounds for the Ten Commandments, one that divides them into 13 verses, based on the number of sof passuk notes, and the other that divides them into ten verses, the actual number of commandments. It is for this reason that not all commandments actually have a sof passuk at the end of their own names.

Other versions

Sof parasha
The end of a single reading (aliya) which is chanted in a different melody, thereby giving the sound of finality to the reading. The tune for the end of the aliya can be applied to different verses based on different reading schedules, including the full parasha (on Shabbat during Shacharit in most synagogues), a partial reading (as is read on weekdays, Shabbat Mincha, and the selected readings of various holidays), or the Triennial cycle.

Sof sefer
At the conclusion to any sefer of the Torah, a special tune is used for the words "hazak hazak venithazek" after the reader finishes the book. These words are recited first by the congregation and then repeated by the reader.

Unicode

References

Cantillation marks